Scott Andrew Buschman (born February 12, 1962) is a United States Coast Guard vice admiral who served as Deputy Commandant for Operations. He previously served as Atlantic Area commander and director of the Homeland Security Joint Task Force – East.

References

Living people
People from Huntington, New York
Military personnel from New York (state)
United States Coast Guard Academy alumni
George Washington University alumni
Massachusetts Institute of Technology alumni
Recipients of the Legion of Merit
United States Coast Guard admirals
1962 births